The cimbasso is a low brass instrument that developed from the upright serpent over the course of the 19th century in Italian opera orchestras, to cover the same range as a tuba or contrabass trombone. The modern instrument has four to six rotary valves (or occasionally piston valves), a forward-facing bell, and a predominantly cylindrical bore. These features lend its sound to the bass of the trombone family rather than the tuba, and its valves allow for more agility than a contrabass trombone. Like the modern contrabass trombone, it is most often pitched in F, although models are made in E♭, and occasionally low CC or BB♭.

Etymology 

The term was used loosely to refer to the lowest bass instrument available in the brass family, which changed over the course of the 19th century; this vagueness has also long impeded research into the instrument's history.

History 

These instruments were constructed from wooden sections like a bassoon, with a trombone-like brass bell, sometimes in the shape of a buccin-style dragon's head. Fingering charts published in 1830 indicate these early  were most likely to have been pitched in C.

Later, the term  was extended to a range of instruments, including the ophicleide and early valved instruments, such as the Pelittone and other early forms of the more conical bass tuba. As this progressed, the term cimbasso was used to refer to a more blending voice than the "basso tuba" or "bombardone", and began to imply the lowest trombone.

By 1872, Verdi expressed his displeasure about "that devilish bombardone" (referring to the tuba) as the bass of the trombone section for his La Scala première of Aida, preferring a "trombone basso". This instrument blended with the usual Italian trombone section of the time—three tenor valve trombones in B—and became the prototype for the modern cimbasso.

Construction 

The modern cimbasso emerged in Germany in the early 20th century, its design ultimately descended from the Pelitti design preferred by Verdi. In the 1960s, Thein took the modern contrabass trombone in F developed by Dehmel and Kunitz and fitted it with the same valves and fingering as the modern F tuba, and named this new instrument the "cimbasso".

The mouthpiece and leadpipe are positioned in front of the player, the valve tubing section is arranged vertically between the player's knees and rests on the floor with a cello-style endpin, and the bell is arranged over the player's left shoulder to point horizontally forward, similar to a trombone. This design accommodates the instrument in cramped orchestra pits and allows a direct, concentrated sound to be projected towards the conductor and audience.

The mouthpiece receiver is usually sized to take tuba shank mouthpieces, or sometimes the smaller bass trombone shank size depending on the size of the instrument.

The bore tends to range between that of a contrabass trombone and a small F tuba, and even larger for the larger instruments in low C or B♭.
There has been demand over time for larger bore instruments with a more conical bore and larger bell, in contrast with the trombone-like sound from smaller cylindrical bore instruments. This is because cimbasso parts are often played in the modern orchestra by tuba players, particularly in the US.

The cimbasso is usually built with rotary valves, although some Italian makers use piston valves. British instrument maker Mike Johnson builds cimbassi with four compensating piston valves as commonly found on British tubas, in both F/C and E♭/B♭ sizes. Los Angeles tubist Jim Self had a compact F cimbasso built in the shape of a euphonium which has been named the "Jimbasso".
In 2004 Swiss brass instrument manufacturer Haag released a cimbasso in F built with five Hagmann valves and a  bore. This instrument is used by several operas and orchestras, including Badische Staatskapelle, Hungarian State Opera, and Sydney Symphony Orchestra, and by Swedish jazz musician Mattis Cederberg.

Repertoire and performance 

Although the cimbasso in its modern form is most commonly used for performances of late Romantic Italian operas by Verdi and Puccini, since the mid 20th century it has found increased and more diverse use. In the late 1960s Mexican jazz musician Raul Batista Romero began featuring cimbasso in his albums. Along with the contrabass trombone, it has increasingly been called for in film and video game soundtracks since the late 1990s. British composer Brian Ferneyhough calls for cimbasso in his large 2006 orchestral work Plötzlichkeit, and nu metal rock band Korn used two cimbassos in the live backing orchestra for their acoustic MTV Unplugged album.

Historically informed performance of early cimbasso parts presents particular challenges. Unless proficient with period instruments such as serpent or ophicleide, it is difficult for orchestral low-brass players to perform on instruments that resemble the early cimbassi in form or timbre. It is also challenging for instrument builders to find good surviving examples to replicate or adapt. 

Although there is still a lack of consensus from conductors and orchestras, using a large-bore modern orchestral C tuba to play cimbasso parts is considered inappropriate by some writers and players. Meucci recommends using only a small, narrow-bore F tuba, or a bass trombone. James Gourlay, conductor and former tubist with BBC Symphony Orchestra and Zürich Opera, recommends playing most cimbasso repertoire on the modern F cimbasso, as a compromise between the larger B♭  instrument and the bass trombone. He also recommends using a euphonium for early cimbasso parts, which is closer to the sound of the serpent or ophicleide that would have been used before 1860. Douglas Yeo, former bass trombonist with Boston Symphony Orchestra, even suggests that in a modern trombone section playing parts intended for valve trombones on slide trombones, it should not be unreasonable to perform the cimbasso part on a modern F contrabass trombone.

See also 

 Tuba
 Contrabass trombone
 Italian opera

References

Bibliography 

 
 
 
 

Brass instruments
Contrabass instruments
Bass (sound)
Italian musical instruments
Orchestral instruments